Umberto Busani (1 February 1915 – 29 October 1957) was an Italian footballer who played as a forward for a number of Italian clubs in the 1930s and 1940s, most notably S.S. Lazio and S.S.C. Napoli.

Playing career
Fast, talented and regarded as one of the best wingers in S.S.C. Napoli's history, he started his career at Chievo. He helped Chievo reach the final of the championship.

He then moved on to Alexandria, for whom he made his Serie A debut on 22 September 1935. He played in the cup final played in Genoa on 11 June 1936, but his side lost against Turin. He then moved to S.S. Lazio in 1936 for a joint fee of 400,000 lira, along with teammates Luigi Milano and Giovanni Riccardi.

He made his debut on 13 September 1936 in a 3–0 victory over A.C. Milan. The club finished in second place in the final standings, three points behind champions Bologna. He was the fifth most prolific goalscorer with fifteen goals that year. The following years were less positive for the biancoazzurri; an eighth place in the championship was followed by a ninth-place finish in 1938–39. In his early years in Rome he invariably started matches, missing only a few games, the majority due to a fractured collarbone.

He moved to Napoli in 1940 and the Neapolitan side finished the 1940–41 season in eighth place. The following year, Busani was the club's top scorer, but Napoli succumbed to relegation, despite some memorable victories against Milan and Juventus. The 1942–43 season, Napoli's first in Serie B, saw him play all the games and score 10 goals (the team's third top scorer), but this was not enough to bring the team promotion.

After the war he returned to Napoli and he finished as the club's top scorer in 1946–47 with 12 goals. The next season was negative for both Napoli and Busani, ending with the relegation back in Serie B; he played only 12 games and scored two goals, so decided to finish his career at Casertana.

Post-retirement
After retiring, Busani settled in Campania, where he ran a sports shop and coached local sides.

References

1915 births
1957 deaths
Italian footballers
Sportspeople from Parma
Association football forwards
Serie A players
Serie B players
A.C. ChievoVerona players
Hellas Verona F.C. players
U.S. Alessandria Calcio 1912 players
S.S.C. Napoli players
S.S. Lazio players
Footballers from Emilia-Romagna